The Red Rock River is a roughly  river in southwestern Montana in the United States. Brower's Spring is near the furthest headwaters of the Missouri River, one of the major watercourses of the central United States. As such, it is also the furthest headwaters of the entire Missouri-Mississippi river system, today the fourth longest river (after the Nile, Amazon, and Yangtze) on earth and once the third-longest.  

The drainage flows north and west with its name changing to "Red Rock Creek" into the Red Rock Lakes in the middle of a wide grassy valley; the Red Rock River issues from the west side of Lower Red Rock Lake. It flows west, receiving many tributaries such as Peet Creek and Long Creek, widening into the Lima Reservoir and then passing through a canyon, which ends near Lima, Montana. From there, it flows northwest through a valley, passing Kidd and Red Rock, and into Clark Canyon Reservoir. Under the waters of the lake was once the confluence of the Red Rock and Horse Prairie Creek, forming the Beaverhead River, a tributary of the Jefferson River, in turn a headwater of the Missouri River.

See also

List of rivers of Montana
Montana Stream Access Law

Notes

Rivers of Montana
Rivers of Beaverhead County, Montana
Tributaries of the Beaverhead River